Marguerite may refer to:

People 
 Marguerite (given name), including a list of people with the name

Places
Marguerite, Pennsylvania, an unincorporated community
Marguerite Bay, Antarctic Peninsula
Marguerite Island, Adélie Land, Antarctica

Entertainment
Marguerite (musical), a 2008 West End musical by Michel Legrand
"Margueritte", a song by Oregon from the album Winter Light
Marguerite (2015 film), a French film
Marguerite (2017 film), a Canadian film

Ships
, a United States Navy patrol vessel in commission from 1917 to 1919
, another United States Navy patrol vessel in commission from 1917 and 1919; renamed SP-892 in 1918 to avoid confusion
, a Royal Navy sloop transferred to the Royal Australian Navy in 1920
Marguerite (ship), a French cargo ship launched in 1912, sunk by a U-boat in 1917

Plants 
Argyranthemum, a genus of plants in the daisy family, especially A. frutescens
Garden marguerites, a group of hybrids derived from Argyranthemum and related genera widely sold for garden use
Leucanthemum vulgare, the original marguerite (the word "marguerite" used as the plant name is of French origin)

Other uses
Marguerite (horse), a racehorse
Stanford Marguerite Shuttle, a transportation service of Stanford University

See also
SS Princess Marguerite, Princess Marguerite II and Princess Marguerite III, a series of Canadian coastal passenger vessels
Marguerite route, a tourist route in Denmark
Margarita (disambiguation)
Margueritte